The Columbus mayoral election of 1975 was the 75th mayoral election in Columbus, Ohio.  It was held on Tuesday, November 4, 1975.  Democratic party nominee John Rosemond was defeated by incumbent Republican mayor Tom Moody.

Further reading

Mayoral elections in Columbus, Ohio
1975 Ohio elections
Columbus